Beverly Schmidt Blossom (August 28, 1926 – November 1, 2014) was an American modern dancer, choreographer, and teacher. She was an original member and soloist with the Alwin Nikolais Dance Theater, a modern dance choreographer for Illinois Dance Theatre, Blossom & Co. and others, and a professor at the University of Illinois Urbana-Champaign.

Training
Born in Chicago, Illinois to Theodore and Florence Schmidt, she held a bachelor's degree in liberal arts from Roosevelt University and a master's degree in dance from Sarah Lawrence College where performance artist Meredith Monk was one of her dance composition students.

New York career
She was a principal dancer of the Alwin Nikolais Dance Theatre from 1953–63, dancing alongside Murray Louis and Phyllis Lamhut. She produced concerts of her own choreography in New York in the 1960s, participating in the development of the Filmstage theatre of actor/poet Roberts Blossom, her husband from 1966-70.

University of Illinois
Blossom was professor of dance at the University of Illinois at Urbana-Champaign from 1967–90, and was a professor emerita until her death. She choreographed and performed more than 100 works and received numerous grants from the National Endowment for the Arts, New York State Council for the Arts, Illinois Arts Council, and private foundations.

Solo career
She renewed her career as a performer, presenting her solo works at the 1988 Jacob's Pillow, Massachusetts "Splash" Festival, and at the Joyce Theatre 1989 showcase "Womanworks".

New York Times reviews
Jennifer Dunning of The New York Times called Blossom "a rare performer", adding "a zany, hilarious goof of a clown, Miss Blossom is also a tragic figure of great dignity, bringing an audience to tears and laughter as her dances ravel and unravel, simultaneously, before one's eyes" (1985).

In 1994 Anna Kisselgoff described Blossom's tribute to her mentor Nikolais after his death: "Here, she is the tattered clown with a suitcase, gazing at a shattered Styrofoam mannekin. Reassembling the figure, she swept it into a soaring curve. but this was only a remembrance of poetic time past, a strong tribute to the death of an artist."

Documentary of Roberts Blossom
Blossom appeared in a documentary about her former husband, actor Roberts Blossom in 2000, titled, Full Blossom: The Life and Times of Actor/Poet Roberts Blossom. The couple had one son, Michael.

Retirement
After her retirement, she choreographed for her own company (Blossom & Co. Inc.), in addition to guest performing and teaching. In December 2010, she appeared in the Nikolais Centennial Alumni Concerts at Hunter College, speaking and performing at both presentations.

Blossom was a mentor to Henning Rübsam, who first studied with her at the Nikolais studio and then performed her work starting in 1994. Other interpreters of Blossom's dances have included Betsy Fisher, Cynthia Pipkin-Doyle and Christine Reisner.

Awards
1993: New York Dance and Performance Award (Bessie Award) for sustained achievement.
2009: Martha Hill Award for Lifetime Achievement,  November 30, 2009 at The Cathedral in New York City. Fellow Nikolais dancer Murray Louis was Master of Ceremonies and Jennifer Dunning presented the award.

Death
Beverly Blossom died in Chicago, Illinois on November 1, 2014, from cancer, aged 88. Her sole immediate survivor is her son, Michael Blossom.

References

1926 births
2014 deaths
Artists from Chicago
Modern dancers
American choreographers
Roosevelt University alumni
Sarah Lawrence College alumni
University of Illinois Urbana-Champaign faculty
Bessie Award winners
Deaths from cancer in Illinois